Mariusz Wiesiak (born 1 April 1981) is a Polish former professional cyclist.

Major results

2002
 1st La Roue Tourangelle
 3rd Giro del Mendrisiotto
 3rd Gran Premio della Liberazione
2003
 1st Giro del Mendrisiotto
 3rd Trofeo Internazionale Bastianelli
 3rd Road race, National Under-23 Road Championships
 5th Trofeo Banca Popolare di Vicenza
2004
 1st Stage 4 Paths of King Nikola
 1st Stage 3 Szlakiem Grodów Piastowskich
 1st Stage 1 Tour of Japan
2005
 1st Memoriał Romana Siemińskiego
 Tour du Cameroun
1st Stages 7 & 10
 1st Stage 2 Tour de Hokkaido
2006
 1st Archer Grand Prix
 Tour de Hokkaido
1st Stages 4 & 5
 2nd Overall Tour du Loir-et-Cher
2007
 6th La Roue Tourangelle
2008
 7th Gran Premio Bruno Beghelli
2009
 1st Prologue Tour de Kumano
 4th Overall Tour de Hokkaido
2011
 5th Overall Tour de Okinawa
 7th Overall Tour de Hokkaido
2012
 1st Stage 1 Tour of Malopolska
 5th Tour de Okinawa
 5th Memoriał Andrzeja Trochanowskiego

References

External links

1981 births
Living people
Polish male cyclists
Sportspeople from Toruń